Crooked Media is a progressive American political media company. It was founded in 2017 by Jon Favreau, Jon Lovett, and Tommy Vietor, all former top Barack Obama staffers and former co-hosts of the Keepin' it 1600 podcast. Dan Pfeiffer, also a former Obama employee, co-hosts their flagship podcast Pod Save America with them.

The company's offerings encompass a network of podcasts; a news and opinion website; live shows and tours; and a social media and live streaming presence. It aims to foster open conversation between liberals and support grassroots activism and political participation.

The company's flagship podcast, Pod Save America, airs twice weekly and averages more than 1.5 million listeners an episode. In Fall 2018, four Pod Save America one-hour specials aired on HBO. By November of its first year, the podcast had been downloaded more than 120 million times, and 175 million times by February 2018.

The company is headquartered in Los Angeles, California.

History 
Favreau, Lovett, Vietor, and Pfeiffer hosted The Ringer's Keepin' it 1600 political podcast from March 2016 until December 2016.

In 2016 Favreau, Lovett, and Vietor started podcasting and activism on a full-time basis. The three formed the Crooked Media company in January 2017 and launched a new podcast called Pod Save America the following month. Pfeiffer opted not to join the company, and instead to co-host the Thursday edition of the show. Crooked Media is named after a favorite term used by Donald Trump. When asked whether he thought Crooked Media was a 'media company', Favreau said, "I don't know if it's a political movement or a media company".

The company announced a major expansion in October 2017 with the launch of Crooked.com, a text journalism site helmed by Editor-In-Chief Brian Beutler, a former New Republic senior editor. The expansion introduced the 'Crooked Contributors' network—a group of progressive journalists, activists, organizers, policy experts, campaign veterans, and comedians who would be featured in podcasts, videos, and articles produced by the company.

The company uses advertising revenue to fund the business.

Hosts

Podcasts 
Crooked Media produces and distributes podcasts with numerous hosts, focusing on news and politics.

Pod Save America 

Pod Save America is a twice weekly progressive political podcast. On Mondays it is hosted by Favreau, Vietor, and Lovett, and on Thursdays it is hosted by Favreau and Pfeiffer. Pod Save America explicitly aims to encourage its listeners to engage in activism and political persuasion.

Pod Save America has run a number of special series and mini-series. For example, Tommy Vietor hosted a series on the 2020 Iowa Democratic presidential caucuses, and Dan Pfeiffer and Alyssa Mastromonaco hosted a series on the vice presidential candidate selection process.

Pod Save the People 

Hosted by organizer and activist DeRay Mckesson, Pod Save the People talks about culture, social justice, and politics by exploring the history, the language, and the people who are shaping the struggle for progress — and talking about the steps that each individual can take to make a difference.

Pod Save the World 

Hosted by Vietor and former Deputy National Security Advisor Ben Rhodes, Pod Save the World discusses foreign policy and international relations.

Lovett or Leave It 

Hosted by Lovett, former speech and joke writer for President Obama. Lovett or Leave it is a recording of a weekly live show and features the eponymous host dissecting the news with a panel of guests. The show features a variety of games, as well as one-on-one interviews that center around the week's news and American politics.

Other series
Other podcasts that have been produced and distributed by Crooked Media include:
With Friends Like These, an interview-based podcast that aims to showcase discussions between people who disagree or come from different backgrounds, hosted by Ana Marie Cox
Hysteria, a politics and culture podcast with a focus on women's issues, hosted by Erin Ryan and Alyssa Mastromonaco
Keep It, a podcast on culture hosted by Ira Madison III and Louis Virtel
Crooked Minis, for more in-depth coverage on topics that are less directly related to current events
The Wilderness, a docuseries hosted by Jon Favreau related to the status and future of the Democratic Party
This Land, an investigation of Carpenter v. Murphy hosted by Rebecca Nagle
America Dissected, a treatment of the American health system hosted by Abdul El-Sayed
What a Day, a daily news podcast hosted by Tre'vell Anderson, Priyanka Aribindi, Josie Duffy Rice, and Juanita Tolliver
Missing America, a foreign policy podcast hosted by Ben Rhodes
Wind of Change, a mini-series on the song Wind of Change hosted by Patrick Radden Keefe
Hall of Shame, a sports podcast hosted by Rachel Bonnetta and Rachna Fruchbom
Unholier Than Thou, a religion podcast hosted by Phillip Picardi
Six Feet Apart, a podcast on the COVID-19 pandemic hosted by Alex Wagner
Rubicon, a podcast on the impeachments of Donald Trump hosted by Brian Beutler
Takeline, a podcast about sports focused on basketball, hosted by Jason Concepcion and Renee Montgomery
Offline, a podcast about how being extremely online is "shaping everything from politics and culture to the ways we live, work, and interact with one another."
X-Ray Vision, a pop culture podcast by Emmy award winning Jason Concepcion.
Imani State of Mind, a mental health podcast hosted by Dr. Imani Walker and Megan "MegScoop" Thomas.

Tours 
Crooked Media has produced multiple live tours. The first tour by Crooked Media podcasts was in fall of 2017. The tour featured live versions of Pod Save America and Lovett or Leave it, and appearances from DeRay Mckesson, Ana Marie Cox, and other guests. Crooked Media tours have not just visited locations in the United States, including a 2018 tour with performances in Stockholm, Oslo, Amsterdam, and London.

Activism 
Crooked Media engages directly in political activism, including advocating for liberal policies and candidates, supporting get out the vote efforts, raising money, and encouraging political demonstrations. In elections from 2017 onwards, the company has collaborated with MoveOn on direct activism efforts, such as directing Pod Save America listeners to Republican town-hall meetings, and with Swing Left and Indivisible to raise money and encourage activism relevant to the 2018 United States elections and the Affordable Care Act. The Los Angeles Times reported that according to Crooked Media, it raised $2.7 million and directed 22,000 volunteers to fill shifts in competitive races during the 2018 midterms.

In May 2019, the Crooked Media campaign "Vote Save America" launched the Fuck Gerry(mandering) fund with Data for Progress to direct listener's donations to 14 of the closest races in Virginia. Ahead of the 2020 cycle, under the umbrella of Vote Save America, they raised $32 million in the third quarter of 2020, which was directed to Democratic candidates. Through the Vote Save America program, Crooked Media has partnered with Fair Fight, an organization devoted to fighting voter suppression led by Stacey Abrams, as well as with VoteRiders to spread state-specific information on voter ID requirements.

Reception 
The company's podcasts regularly sit near the top of the iTunes list of most popular podcasts. New York Times has called Crooked Media 'the left's answer to conservative talk radio'. Pod Save America was called "the nation's most popular political podcast" by Newsweek. Reviewing the first episodes of the company's flagship podcast, The Guardian noted: "Pod Save America's commentators are sparky and funny—and they have a habit of talking a whole lot of sense."

References

External links 

 

 
2017 establishments in the United States
Podcasting companies
Mass media companies established in 2017
American news websites
Internet properties established in 2017
Companies based in California
Mass media in Los Angeles County, California
Mass media in Los Angeles